Bonaventura Poerio, O.F.M. Obs. (1648–1722) was a Roman Catholic prelate who served as Archbishop of Salerno (1697–1722).

Biography
Bonaventura Poerio was born on 3 Feb 1648 in Taverna, Italy and ordained a priest in the Observant branch of the Order of Friars Minor.
On 11 Nov 1697, he was appointed during the papacy of Pope Innocent XII as Archbishop of Salerno.
On 17 Nov 1697, he was consecrated bishop by Sebastiano Antonio Tanara, Cardinal-Priest of Santi Quattro Coronati, with Francesco Pannocchieschi d'Elci, Archbishop of Pisa, and Carlo Loffredo, Archbishop of Bari, serving as co-consecrators. 
He served as Archbishop of Salerno until his death on 18 Nov 1722.

References

External links and additional sources
 (for Chronology of Bishops) 
 (for Chronology of Bishops) 

17th-century Italian Roman Catholic archbishops
Bishops appointed by Pope Innocent XII
1648 births
1722 deaths